Ordinary is an unincorporated community in Gloucester County, Virginia, United States. Ordinary has a post office with ZIP code 23131.

The community was named after the local ordinary (i.e. public dining hall). Woodville School was added to the National Register of Historic Places in 2004.

References

Unincorporated communities in Gloucester County, Virginia
Unincorporated communities in Virginia